Henry Fitzjames (c. 1626 – 1685) was an English politician who sat in the House of Commons  in 1659 .

Fitzjames was the son of Leweston Fitzjames of Leweston, Dorset. He matriculated at Lincoln College, Oxford on 4 March 1642, aged 15. He was a student of the Middle Temple in 1647. 

In 1659, Fitzjames was elected Member of Parliament for Haslemere in the Third Protectorate Parliament. 
 
Fitzjames was buried at Bow Chappell on 5 March 1685.

Fitzjames was the brother of Thomas Fitzjames and John Fitzjames.

References

1626 births
1685 deaths
English MPs 1659
Politicians from Dorset
Alumni of Lincoln College, Oxford
Members of the Middle Temple
Year of birth uncertain
Place of birth missing